The Merry Christmas Album is the 58th studio album by American musician James Brown. The album was released on November 16, 1999, by Waxworks Records. It contains 11 Christmas related songs co-written with Derrick Monk, who also produced the album. Heather Phares, writing for AllMusic, felt the album was fun but not one of Brown's best. It is also Brown's fourth  Christmas album in 31 years.

Reception
In a review for AllMusic, Heather Phares felt the album followed the same pattern of his other Christmas albums with his usual funk music and social commentary lyrics; she concludes that the album is festive fun, but not up the standard of his best work.

Track listing

References

James Brown albums
1999 Christmas albums
albums produced by James Brown